Rangeland management (also range management, range science, or arid-land management) is a professional natural science that centers around the study of rangelands and the "conservation and sustainable management [of Arid-Lands] for the benefit of current societies and future generations." Range management is defined by Holechek et al. as the "manipulation of rangeland components to obtain optimum combination of goods and services for society on a sustained basis."

History
The earliest form of Rangeland Management is not formally deemed part of the natural science studied today, although its roots can be traced to nomadic grazing practices of the neolithic agricultural revolution when humans domesticated plants and animals under pressures from population growth and environmental change. Humans might even have altered the environment in times preceding the  Neolithic through hunting of large-game, whereby large losses of grazing herbivores could have resulted in altered ecological states; meaning humans have been inadvertently managing land throughout prehistory.

Rangeland management was developed in the United States in response to rangeland deterioration and in some cases, denudation, due to overgrazing and other misuse of arid lands as demonstrated by the 20th century "Dust Bowl" and described in Hardin's 1968 "Tragedy of the Commons". Historically, the discipline focused on the manipulation of grazing and the proper use of rangeland vegetation for livestock.

Modern application

Global 
Range management's focus has been expanded to include the host of ecosystem services that rangelands provide to humans world-wide. Key management components seek to optimize such goods and services through the protection and enhancement of soils, riparian zones, watersheds, and vegetation complexes, sustainably improving outputs of consumable range products such as red meat, wildlife, water, wood, fiber, leather, energy resource extraction, and outdoor recreation, as well as maintaining a focus on the manipulation of grazing activities of large herbivores to maintain or improve animal and plant production.

Pastoralism has become a contemporary anthropological and ecological study as it faces many threats including fragmentation of land, conversion of rangeland into urban development, lack of grazing movement, impending threats on global diversity, damage to species with large terrain, decreases in shared public goods, decreased biological movements, threats of a "tragedy of enclosures", limitation of key resources, reduced biomass and invasive plant species growth. Interest in contemporary pastoralist cultures like the Maasai has continued to increase, especially because the traditional syncreticly-adaptive ability of pastoralists could promise lessons in collaborative and adaptive management for contemporary pastoralist societies threatened by globalization as well as for contemporary non-pastoralist societies that are managing livestock on rangelands.

United States of America 
The United States Society for Range Management  is "the professional society dedicated to supporting persons who work with rangelands and have a commitment to their sustainable use." The primary Rangeland Management publications include the Journal of Range Management, Rangelands, and Rangeland Ecology & Management.

As climate change continues to disrupt a host of rangeland functions, the Society for Range Management has declared: "The Society for Range Management is committed to promoting adaptation to and mitigation of climate change through the sponsorship of workshops, symposia, research and educational publications, and appropriate policy recommendations. The Society will strive to maximize opportunities and minimize challenges posed by climate change to promote productive rangeland ecosystems that ensure food security, human livelihoods, and continued delivery of diverse ecosystem services." Emerging evidence suggests that rangelands are extremely vulnerable to the threats of climate change, as more severe heatwaves, droughts, evaporation, and catastrophic flood events will consequentially alter ecological states, and negatively affect forage production, both of which will negatively impact ecosystem functioning and the sustainable production of ecosystem services. In an open letter to the White House in 2017, the president of the SRM offered President Trump the society's support in seeking management strategies to mitigate climate-induced phenomenon like drought and forest fires, a subject which was brought to the national debate stage and which has received significant controversial push-back by Trump and his administration. Likewise in 2021 the SRM and several other institutions sent an open letter to President Biden urging for more research and development funding to be provisioned toward agricultural and food systems research, especially as climate change threatened national security of ag resources.

Australia 
The Australian Rangeland Society is the peak group of rangeland professionals in Australia. It is an independent and non-aligned association of people interested in the management and sustainable use of rangelands. Rangeland Management publications from the Society include The Rangeland Journal  and the Range Management Newsletter.

Education and employment

In the United States, the study of range science is commonly offered at land-grant universities including New Mexico State University, Colorado State University, Oregon State University, North Dakota State University, South Dakota State University, Texas A&M University, Texas Tech University, the University of Arizona, the University of Idaho, the University of Wyoming, Utah State University, and Montana State University. The Range Science curriculum is strongly tied to animal science, as well as plant ecology, soil science, wildlife management, climatology and anthropology. Courses in a typical Range Science curriculum may include ethology, range animal nutrition, plant physiology, plant ecology, plant identification, plant communities, microbiology, soil sciences, fire control, agricultural economics, wildlife ecology, ranch management, Socioeconomics, cartography, hydrology, Ecophysiology, and environmental policy. These courses are essential to entering a range science profession.

Students with degrees in range science are eligible for a host of technician-type careers working for the federal government under the Bureau of Land Management, the United States Fish and Wildlife Service, the Agricultural Research Service, the United States Environmental Protection Agency, the NRCS, or the US Forest Service as range conservationists, inventory technicians, range monitoring/animal science agents, field botanists, natural-resource technicians, vegetation/habitat monitors, GIS programming assistants, general range technicians, and as ecological assessors, as well as working in the private sector as range managers, ranch managers, producers, commercial consultants, mining and agricultural real estate agents, or as Range/ Ranch Consultants. Individuals who complete degrees at the M.S. or P.h.D. level, can seek academic careers as professors, extension specialists, research assistants, and adjunct staff, in addition to a number of professional research positions for government agencies such as the US Department of Agriculture and other state run departments.

See also
Conservation grazing
Land management
Natural Resources Conservation Service
Range condition scoring
Wildlife management
Upland pasture

References

Land management in the United States
Natural sciences
Environmental conservation